Rashean Jamil Mathis (born August 27, 1980) is a former American football cornerback in the National Football League (NFL). He played college football at Bethune–Cookman University, and was drafted by the Jacksonville Jaguars in the second round of the 2003 NFL Draft. He also played for the Detroit Lions and is regarded as one of the best defensive players in the history of the Jacksonville Jaguars.

Early years
Mathis attended Englewood High School in Jacksonville at the same time as Brett Myers of the Chicago White Sox, and was a student and a letterman in football. In football, he was a second team All-State, All-Conference, and an All-City honoree. Also, claims being recruited out of high school for baseball was highlight of his athletic career. Central Florida Community College and Indian River Community Colleges offered him scholarships to play center field.

College career
Mathis enrolled in Bethune-Cookman University, where he played for the Bethune–Cookman Wildcats football team. He did not receive any scholarship offers from larger schools because he broke his leg during high school.

He currently holds the record for the most interceptions in a single season and in a career in Division 1 collegiate football history.(2011)
In 2002, he won the Buck Buchanan Award for Division I-AA (now FCS) defensive player of the year.

Professional career
Mathis attended the NFL Scouting Combine and performed all of the combine and positional drills. At the conclusion of the pre-draft process, Mathis was projected to be a second or third round pick by NFL draft experts and scouts. He was ranked as the top free safety prospect by DraftScout.com and was ranked as the second best safety by NFL analyst Mike Mayock.

Jacksonville Jaguars
The Jacksonville Jaguars selected Mathis in the second round (39th overall) of the 2003 NFL Draft. Mathis was the second safety selected in 2003, behind Marcus Trufant (11th overall). He was also the eighth defensive back drafted in 2003 and was the first player selected from Bethune-Cookman since Antwuan Wyatt was drafted in 1997. Mathis also became the third highest draft pick from Bethune-Cookman, behind defensive tackle Booker Reese (32nd overall, 1982) and defensive back Terry Williams (37th overall, 1988).

On July 24, 2003, the Jacksonville Jaguars signed Mathis to a four-year, $3.17 million contract.

Mathis entered training camp slated as a starting safety. Head coach Jack Del Rio named Mathis the starting free safety to begin the regular season, alongside strong safety Donovan Darius.

He made his professional regular season debut and first career start in the Jacksonville Jaguars' season-opener at the Carolina Panthers and made two combined tackles, a pass deflection, and his first career interception off a pass by quarterback Jake Delhomme in their 24-23 loss. In Week 6, Mathis was converted to cornerback due to injuries to Jason Craft and Kiwaukee Thomas. In Week 10, he collected a season-high nine solo tackles during a 28-23 victory against the Indianapolis Colts. He started in all 16 games in 2003 and made a career-high 81 combined tackles (71 solo), nine pass deflections, and two interceptions.

Mathis entered training camp slated as the No. 1 starting cornerback after Fernando Bryant departed in free agency. Head coach Jack Del Rio named Mathis and Dewayne Washington the starting cornerbacks to begin the regular season.

He had his best year in 2006, collecting eight interceptions (tied for third in the league) and being voted to the Pro Bowl where he started alongside Champ Bailey. He and John Henderson were the only Jaguars on the team to attend the Pro Bowl that year.

On August 24, 2005, the Jacksonville Jaguars signed Mathis to a five-year, $25.50 million contract extension that includes $9.40 million guaranteed.

Mathis had his most significant game as a professional on January 5, 2008 in an AFC Wild Card playoff game against the Pittsburgh Steelers. He had two interceptions, returning one for a touchdown.

On December 1, 2008, Mathis sustained a knee injury against the Houston Texans and was put on the injured reserve list, ending his season.

On November 16, 2009, Mathis injured his groin while breaking up a pass in a win over the New York Jets. He would only play in one other game during the 2009 season, missing the rest because of the lingering injury.

On November 13, 2011, Mathis tore his ACL against the Indianapolis Colts, ending his season.

On March 8, 2012, Mathis agreed on a one-year, $5 million contract with the Jaguars.

On March 5, 2013, the Jaguars announced they would not offer Mathis a new contract.

Detroit Lions

On August 17, 2013, Mathis signed a one-year contract with the Detroit Lions. He re-signed with the Lions on April 14, 2014. On March 19, 2015, the Lions re-signed Mathis to a two-year, $3.5 million contract.

On February 16, 2016, Mathis announced his retirement.

On April 13, 2016, Mathis signed a one-day contract to retire as a member of the Jacksonville Jaguars.

Jaguars franchise records
 Most career interceptions: 30 
 Most career interception return yards: 512 
 Most career defensive touchdowns: 3 
 Most career passes defended: 99

NFL statistics

Key
 GP: games played
 COMB: combined tackles
 TOTAL: total tackles
 AST: assisted tackles
 SACK: sacks
 FF: forced fumbles
 FR: fumble recoveries
 FR YDS: fumble return yards 
 INT: interceptions
 IR YDS: interception return yards
 AVG IR: average interception return
 LNG: longest interception return
 TD: interceptions returned for touchdown
 PD: passes defensed

In the media
In 2006, Mathis appeared as a celebrity contestant on Wheel of Fortune during NFL Players Week.

References

External links
Detroit Lions bio

1980 births
Living people
Engelwood High School (Florida) alumni
Players of American football from Jacksonville, Florida
American football cornerbacks
American football safeties
Bethune–Cookman Wildcats football players
Jacksonville Jaguars players
Detroit Lions players
American Conference Pro Bowl players